Probable tRNA(His) guanylyltransferase is an enzyme that in humans is encoded by the THG1L gene.

References

Further reading